The Bangladesh Knitwear Manufacturers and Exporters Association or BKMEA is a national trade organization of Knitwear manufacturers in Bangladesh and is located in  Dhaka, Bangladesh. Member of Parliament Salim Osman is the president of the body. It is one of the main organisations which is expanding the ready-made garments industry of Bangladesh, and assisting the government and labour organisations to frame policy guidelines for this industry. Although there are some criticism related to the commitment of the members of this organisation to raise the labour and environmental conditions within this industry, it is almost impossible to sustainably grow this industry without this organisation's firm contribution and meaningful programs.

History
BKMEA was founded in 1996. It has its own research unit. BKMEA in a partnership with Save The Children has a program to eliminate child labor in the factories of its members. It works with Deutsche Gesellschaft für Internationale Zusammenarbeit to improve labor conditions in Bangladesh garments factories.

References

1996 establishments in Bangladesh
Organisations based in Dhaka
Trade associations based in Bangladesh
Textile industry associations